Rütschenhausen in Lower Franconia is a little village in the commune Wasserlosen.
It has about 200 inhabitants.

References

Villages in Bavaria